Barham and Woolley is a civil parish in the Huntingdonshire district of Cambridgeshire, England.  The parish includes the villages of Barham and Woolley.

Demography

Population
In the period 1801 to 1901 the population of Barham and Woolley was recorded every ten years by the UK census.  During this time the population was in the range of 97 (the lowest in 1901) and 229 (the highest in 1861).

From 1901, a census was taken every ten years with the exception of 1941 (due to the Second World War).

All population census figures from report Historic Census figures Cambridgeshire to 2011 by Cambridgeshire Insight.
The population figures prior to 1951 are calculated by combining the population figures for the two separate parishes of Barham and of Woolley.

References

External links

Civil parishes in Cambridgeshire
Huntingdonshire